Körfuknattleiksdeild Þórs Þorlákshafnar is an Icelandic basketball club, commonly known as Þór Þorlákshöfn. It is a subdivision of Þór Þorlákshöfn multi sports club, based in the town of Þorlákshöfn in Iceland. It's men's team currently plays in Úrvalsdeild karla.

Men's basketball

History
On 25 June 2021, Þór won its first ever Icelandic championship by beating Keflavík in the Úrvalsdeild finals. Adomas Drungilas was named the Úrvalsdeild Playoffs MVP. In December 2022, Stöð 2 premiered a documentary, titled Hamingjan er hér, about the clubs history.

Honors 
 Icelandic Championship (1):
2021
 Super Cup (3):
2016, 2017, 2021

 Division I (1):
2011

Notable players

Notable coaches
 Birgir Mikaelsson 2001-2003
 Benedikt Guðmundsson  2010-2015
 Einar Árni Jóhannsson 2015-2018
 Baldur Þór Ragnarsson 2018-2019
 Friðrik Ingi Rúnarsson 2019-2020
 Lárus Jónsson 2020–present

Recent seasons

Women's basketball

History
In May 2020, Þór Þorlákshöfn and Hamar announced that they would field a joint team in the 1. deild kvenna during the upcoming season.

Coaches
 Hallgrímur Helgason 2020–present

Notes

References
Eurobasket men's team profile
KKÍ: Þór Þorlákshöfn (men's) – kki.is  

 
Basketball teams in Iceland